Tench Francis may refer to:

Tench Francis (Sr.) (died 1758), lawyer and jurist in colonial Philadelphia
Tench Francis (Jr.) (1730–1800), his son, merchant and financier in Philadelphia